Betsy Rivers Jackes  (born 1935) is an Australian botanist, researcher, taxonomist and author. Her research interests are the plants in the families Myrsinaceae and Vitaceae.

Education

Jackes completed her BSc in 1957, followed by her MSc in 1959, at the University of New England (UNE) in Armidale, New South Wales. She won a Fulbright Scholarship to study in the United States and took up a position as a research scholar at the University of Chicago (UC), where she earned her PhD in 1961.

Career

Jackes initially began work as a tutor in botany at UNE in 1957, before taking on the same role at the University of Queensland (UQ) in 1963. From 1973 through to 2018 she was a lecturer at James Cook University (JCU) in Townsville, Queensland, where she headed the Tropical Plant Sciences Department, and was deputy head of the School of Tropical Biology. She is the author (or co-author) of many papers, articles, and environmental consultancy reports, and has published a number of books.

On Thursday, 24 March 2021, Jackes was presented one of the highest JCU awards, a Doctor of Science honoris causa, the sixth awardee for that degree at the university. This was for her sustained contributions to discovering and cataloguing tropical flora in northern Queensland, continued work with plant systematics and the ecology of the tropical flora.  

Jackes was appointed a Member of the Order of Australia in the 2023 Australia Day Honours.

Legacy

, the International Plant Names Index (IPNI) list 43 species of plants that were authored by her. The following is a list of those with articles on this wiki:
 Clematicissus opaca
 Backhousia tetraptera
 Dendrocnide cordifolia
 Myrsine howittiana
 Myrsine richmondensis

Plants named in honour of Jackes include: 

 Betsy's wattle (Acacia jackesiana (Pedley)), a north Queensland floral native with a limited range west and north of Townsville; and 

 the fossilised Cissocarpus jackesiae (Rozefelds) (also listed as Cissocarpus jackesii), a species of grape in the family Vitaceae native to Australia.  The genus Cissocarpus was formed with the grouping of seeds from the Oligocene silcretes.

Selected publications

Research papers
For a more comprehensive list, see

Books
For a more comprehensive list, see

Articles

See also

 Women in science 
 Women in STEM fields

References

1935 births
Living people
Members of the Order of Australia
20th-century Australian botanists
20th-century Australian women scientists